Kovalı Dam is a dam in Turkey. The development was backed by the Turkish State Hydraulic Works.

Kovalı Dam is situated 3 km southwest of Kovalı Mah.

See also
List of dams and reservoirs in Turkey

References

DSI directory, State Hydraulic Works (Turkey), Retrieved December 16, 2009

Dams in Kayseri Province